Sulejman Halilović (born 14 November 1955 in Odžak) is a Bosnian-Herzegovinian retired footballer who played as a forward.

Club career
During his club career he played for FK Jedinstvo Odžak, Dinamo Vinkovci, Red Star Belgrade, Rapid Wien and Sloga Doboj.

International career
He made his debut for Yugoslavia in a friendly match away against France
on 23 April 1983. He has earned a total of 12 caps, scoring 1 goal. He participated in the UEFA Euro 1984 tournament. His final international was a match against Denmark in Euro 1984 on 16 June 1984.

References

External links

 Career story at Reprezentacija.rs.

1955 births
Living people
People from Odžak
Association football forwards
Bosnia and Herzegovina footballers
Yugoslav footballers
Yugoslavia international footballers
UEFA Euro 1984 players
HNK Cibalia players
Red Star Belgrade footballers
SK Rapid Wien players
FK Sloga Doboj players
Yugoslav Second League players
Yugoslav First League players
Austrian Football Bundesliga players
Yugoslav expatriate footballers
Expatriate footballers in Austria
Yugoslav expatriate sportspeople in Austria